The Apostolic Vicariate of Istanbul is a Roman Catholic apostolic vicariate based in the city of Istanbul in Turkey. Its territory is the northwestern region of the country. The current Vicar Apostolic is Mgr Massimiliano Palinuro.

History
 April 15, 1742: Established as Apostolic Vicariate of Constantinople
 November 30, 1990: Renamed as Apostolic Vicariate of Istanbul

Special churches

Cathedral 
Cathedral of the Holy Spirit

Minor basilicas 
Basilique Saint Antoine de Padoue (Basilica of Saint Anthony of Padua)

Other church buildings 
Church of St. Mary Draperis, Istanbul
Church of SS Peter and Paul, Istanbul
Church of Saint Benoit, Istanbul
Our Lady of Lourdes Church, Istanbul
St. Térèse Church

Leadership

Apostolic Vicariate of Constantinople
Erected: 15 April 1742
Latin Name: Constantinopolitanus

Gaspar Gasparini, O.F.M. Conv. (31 May 1677 – 22 Aug 1705 Died)
...
Antonio Balsarini (26 Aug 1730 – 2 Jan 1731 Died)
Francesco Girolamo Bona (18 Jun 1731 – 16 Feb 1750 Died)
Blaise Paoli (18 Mar 1750 Appointed – )
...
Giuseppe Roverani (10 Mar 1767 – 2 Jul 1772 Died)
Giovanni Battista Bavestrelli (31 Aug 1772 – 20 Apr 1777 Died)
Francesco Antonio Fracchia (26 Sep 1778 – 21 Oct 1795 Died)
Julio Maria Pecori, O.F.M. Ref. (21 Oct 1795 – 28 Feb 1796 Died)
Nicolao Lorenzo Timoni (3 Jun 1796 Appointed – Did Not Take Effect)
Giovanni Battista Fonton, O.F.M. Conv. (16 Mar 1799 – 26 Aug 1816 Died)
Binkentios Coressi (26 Aug 1816 – 7 Mar 1835 Died)
...
Leopoldo Angelo Santanchè, O.F.M. (13 Nov 1874 – 3 Apr 1876 Appointed, Archbishop (Personal Title) of Fabriano e Matelica)
Vincenzo Vannutelli (23 Jan 1880 – 22 Dec 1882 Appointed, Apostolic Internuncio to Brazil)
Luigi Rotelli (26 Jan 1883 – 23 May 1887 Appointed, Apostolic Nuncio to France)
...
Vincenzo Sardi di Rivisondoli (10 Apr 1908 – 10 Jun 1914 Resigned)
...
Gauthier Pierre Georges Antoine Dubois, O.F.M. Cap. (15 Nov 1974 – 29 May 1989 Died)
Antuvan Marovitch (29 May 1989 – 15 Dec 1991 Died)

Apostolic Vicariate of Istanbul
Name Changed: 30 November 1990
Louis Pelâtre, A.A. (9 Jul 1992 – 16 Apr 2016 Retired)
Rubén Tierrablanca Gonzalez, O.F.M. (16 Apr 2016 – 22 Dec 2020 Died)
 Lorenzo Piretto, O.P., Archbishop, Apostolic Administrator (24 Dec 2020-13 Sep 2021)
Massimiliano Palinuro (14 Sep 2021 – present)

See also 
 Catholic Church in Turkey
 Bulgarian Catholic Apostolic Vicariate of Constantinople
 Roman Catholic Apostolic Vicariate of Anatolia
 Roman Catholic Archdiocese of Izmir

References

Roman Catholic dioceses in Turkey
Religious organizations established in 1742
Christianity in Istanbul
Roman Catholic dioceses and prelatures established in the 18th century
1742 establishments in the Ottoman Empire